G Pulla Reddy Engineering College is a college of Kurnool, situated in Andhra Pradesh, India. It is affiliated to Jawaharlal Nehru Technological University, Anantapur.

Rankings

The National Institutional Ranking Framework (NIRF) ranked the college in the 201-250 band among the engineering colleges in 2021.

References

External links
 https://www.gprec.ac.in/about-us/

Engineering colleges in Andhra Pradesh
Universities and colleges in Kurnool district
Educational institutions established in 1985
1985 establishments in Andhra Pradesh